EdCamp Ukraine is a movement of educators in Ukraine. It is based on the principles of the worldwide EdCamp movement, which originated in the United States. Ukraine was the third country in Europe and the ninth in the world to join the original movement in 2014. As of 2020, EdCamp Ukraine is the second biggest EdCamp community in the world, and the biggest community of educators in Ukraine.

The EdCamp Ukraine movement is supported by a non-governmental, non-profit public organization of the same name, which focuses on improving the Ukrainian education system. EdCamp Ukraine organizes career-enhancement training for teachers, lobbies the Ukrainian Ministry of Education and Science for educational reforms, and organizes various projects for educators and students.

EdCamp Ukraine's 2018 initiative concerning the development of professional education succeeded in reforming the career-enhancement training process, in particular by de-monopolizing the government-sponsored professional education enterprises. As the initiative's result, in 2019 the new regulations of the Ministry allowed educators to develop their professional skills through a wider range of educational and scientific institutions, as well as through private and legal business ventures. Their education is funded by government or local budgets according to the "money follows the teacher" principle.

The anti-discrimination expertise of EdCamp Ukraine became a part of the Ministry's textbook-approval procedure. EdCamp Ukraine's activity led to the establishment of the New Ukrainian School reform, and to a variety of anti-corruption and de-bureaucratization procedures. For example, in 2019, two independent sources estimated that the de-bureaucratization reforms EdCamp Ukraine lobbied for decreased teacher paperwork by 20 to 30%.

EdCamp Ukraine's signature events are unconferences: free and independent events that focus on communication between educators, international experts, speakers, and government figures. Since 2015, EdCamp Ukraine has organized six national and 186 regional in-person and online unconferences. In 2020, more than 10,000 members attended the Sixth National unconference, which became the biggest online event in Ukraine (as recorded in the Ukraine Record Book).

History

The original movement

The original EdCamp movement was established in 2010, in Philadelphia, Pennsylvania, US. The movement was created as an alternative source of professional development for educators and in response to American educators' complaints about the inefficiencies of their educational system. As of 2020, 44 countries have joined the movement.

In 2019, 2020 and 2021, the EdCamp format was acknowledged by the HundrED organization in their worldwide review of innovative education organizations.

In 2020, EdCamp US merged with the Digital Promise organization, which develops innovations for education especially through incorporating technology.

EdCamp Ukraine

Based on the principals of the original EdCamp movement, EdCamp Ukraine is a movement of Ukrainian educators based around a non-governmental, non-profit public organization that focuses on the independent professional development of educators nationwide. It also works on education system reformation and improvement. Ukraine became the third country in Europe and the ninth in the world to join the original movement. The members of the organization are called "white crows," describing people who seize change in their community and are not afraid to try alternative techniques.

The EdCamp Ukraine organization was founded by Oleksandr Elkin, and as of 2020 he still serves as its Head of Board. Prior to the foundation of the organization, Elkin worked for an IT company and developed programs to improve the Ukrainian education system, such as the school management system School Champion, a platform that connects Ukrainian education institutions. The EdCamp Ukraine organization was inspired by the 2014 Revolution of Dignity in Ukraine.

The EdCamp Ukraine movement began in 2014, in Kharkiv, Ukraine. On December 29, 2015, the EdCamp Ukraine organization was officially registered as a non-profit public organization. In 2017, it launched a crowdfunding project to fund its first office, which was opened in Kharkiv in 2018. In 2019, the organization became the official owner of the EdCamp trade mark in Ukraine.

As of 2020, EdCamp Ukraine is the second biggest EdCamp community in the world and the biggest community of educators in the country, with a membership more than 40000. Of those, 21,802 work in Ukrainian schools, which is about 5% of all Ukrainian educators. According to research, the EdCamp movement is present in half of Ukrainian schools.

Unconferences

One of the key signature events of EdCamp Ukraine are the free unconferences held yearly in Kharkiv, Ukraine. Educators apply and participate in an oral interviewto be selected to attend.

Unconferences are "edutainment" (education/entertainment). Topics are shaped at the beginning of an event, and participants are the main authorities, meaning that every member of the unconference can become a speaker. This format makes it easier for educators to learn from each other, as its sessions are held a free discussion format.

Several main methods and principles of unconferences are: 
 Free attendance
 Independence
 Freedom of initiative
 The "two legs" law, which implies that every member is free to build their own schedule within the event, attending any session or joining any discussion
 The "long tale effect," which means that the most important steps are not made during the discussions or unconferences, but afterwards, when real action towards improvement is taken
 The "speed-geeking" practice (a three-minute tête-à-tête conversation between members and speakers) to spur communication and make as many acquaintances as possible between members and experts at unconferences

Arenas of action

Professional development for educators

National unconferences

EdCamp Ukraine's National unconferences are considered the key event of the year for Ukrainian educators. The first EdCamp Ukraine unconference was held in June 2015, and attended by more than 350 visitors.

The Second National unconference

In April 2016, the second unconference was held in Kharkiv. The event was part of the 2016 Ukrainian Ministry of Education and Science and the Institute of Educational Modernization events. It was held in partnership with more than 40 Ukrainian organizations and financed via crowdfunding at the Ukrainian platform Spilnokosht. Between 500 and 550 people visited the unconference, including around 80 Ukrainian and international experts from 12 countries. The event consisted of 145 sessions in 17 different locations.

Main topics included new technology, an anti-discrimination approach in education, community integration, and English language as national priority. The concept of the New Ukrainian School, a reform in Ukrainian education, was outlined and discussed. International speakers at the event were: Oskar Brenife, author and philosophy Ph.D. from Paris, France; Eva Rambala, lecturer and trainer in non-violent communication, from Budapest, Hungary; and Esther Wojcicki, journalism teacher and media arts program founder from Palo Alto, California, USA.

The Third National unconference

The third EdCamp Ukraine unconference was held in April 2017. Almost 700 educators participated, including people from 20 countries other than Ukraine. The Ukrainian Minister of Education and Science, Liliya Hrynevych, joined the event. There were 20 sessions in 20 locations and 135 speakers from 20 different countries. At this unconference, the Ukrainian version of the Global Teacher Prize was announced.

Main topics at this event included the formation of the New Ukrainian School and future reforms in the Ukrainian school system. British author, speaker, and international advisor on education Ken Robinson addressed the unconference in a 10-minute video message. European Organization for Nuclear Research (CERN) researcher Giovanni Porchellana spoke at the unconference.

The Fourth National unconference

The fourth EdCamp Ukraine unconference was held in Kharkiv in 2018. Participants totaled 946 educators from 24 Ukrainian regions, and 143 experts from 11 countries presented. One of the main topics of the unconference was anti-discrimination in education.

Six hundred EdCampers gathered at the Constitution Square in Kharkiv for a flash mob that was later registered in the Ukrainian Record Book as the biggest gathering of educators ever. Ukrainian and international public figures took part in the flash mob, including Liliya Hrynevych, the Minister of Education and Science; Hadley Ferguson, co-founder of the original EdCamp movement in the US; Caspar Peek, representative from United Nations Population Fund in Ukraine; and Yaacov Hecht, Israel educator and founder of democratic schools. Speakers included Yaacov Hecht, Liliya Hrynevych, and Esa Sinivuori, a Finnish expert from Lumo Education.

The Fifth National unconference

The fifth unconference was held in 2019 in Kharkiv. About 1,000 educators attended, including experts from 20 countries.

Anti-discrimination policies in education were widely discussed during the event. Another main focus introduced the concepts of Social Emotional Ethical Learning system (SEE Learning) to Ukrainian educators (SEE Learning is a system of the "soft skills" that include creative thinking, empathy, the ability to work in a team, and other skills previously introduced to EdCamp Ukraine team by the fourteenth Dalai Lama).) Plans were discussed to incorporate SEE Learning into Ukrainian schools.

The EdCamp Ukraine team invited the President of Ukraine, Volodymyr Zelenskyy, to join the unconference to discuss Ukrainian education and necessary reforms. Due to a scheduling conflict, the President couldn't attend, but addressed the EdCamp Ukraine team and members in a letter. The members were also addressed by the Dalai Lama in his video message.

During the unconference, another record was set: "The biggest number of locations to join an online educators' flash mob" registered Ukraine Record Book. Liliya Hrynevych, as well as several other Ukrainian public figures and international guests such as Giovanni Porchellana from the European Organization for Nuclear Research (CERN), and Israel educator Yaacov Hecht, took part in the flash mob.

The Sixth National unconference

Due to quarantine measures during the COVID-19 pandemic, EdCamp Ukraine's 2020 unconference was held online. Its theme was "High Five for Education." Oleksandr Elkin and EdCamp Ukraine 2020 were acknowledged in the "United States and Ukraine: Virtual EdCamps" issue of Education Continuity, published by the Organisation for Economic Co-operation and Development.

The main subject of the online marathon—education within the Coronavirus pandemic—was discussed by educators and parents from all over Ukraine. It was the first time parents were invited to attend the unconference. More than 10,000 members and 65 speakers from 22 countries joined the online event. People entered virtual unconference sessions 80,689 times. Lectures and sessions totaled 55 hours.

The five main subjects discussed at the event were distance learning, education policies, physical and mental health, financial and legal challenges, and partnership in education.

Due to new Ukrainian Ministry of Education and Science regulations, educators were able to receive a professional development certificate for attending. Many Ukrainian speakers from government and the entertainment industry attended the event and led their own sessions.

International speakers included Hadley Ferguson, co-founder of the original EdCamp movement in the US; Esther Wojcicki, journalism teacher and media arts program founder; Christa Tinari, senior SEE Learning program developer from Emory University; and others. The First Lady of Ukraine, Olena Zelenska, addressed educators and members via video. Ukrainian television hosts Maria Efrosinina and Slava Frolova attended the event. Experts included the Dalai Lama, a Nobel Prize winner; Yuval Noah Harari, historian, teacher, and bestselling author; Anthony Salcito, Microsoft vice-president in regard to education; Andreas Schleicher, developer of the Programme for International Student Assessment; Yaacov Hecht, Israel educator and founder of democratic schools; and others.

EdCamp Joy

In December 2021, was organized the seventh (non) conference - "National EdCamp for joy! -)" (alternative name EdCamp Joy). The (non) conference in the online format lasted 10 days, from December 7 to 18. The event was attended by 1,161 people - teachers of all levels of education, other adults who work with children and parents. The offline part was held in the format of a meeting of international delegations of the EdCamp movement from 18 to 22 December. Memoranda of cooperation were signed between the national movements of EdCamp in six countries (Belarus, Moldova, Georgia, Romania, Armenia), EdCamp Ukraine with the Small Academy of Sciences of Ukraine, and H.S. Skovoroda Kharkiv National Pedagogical University. The event was attended by 30 world-renowned scientists, educators, psychologists, thought leaders, whose research and practice relate to the phenomenon of joy. This is the world educational expert and developer of international PISA testing Andreas Schleicher (Germany), education specialist, documentary film producer, venture investor and writer Ted Dintersmith, psychologist, writer, founder of the teaching program at Williams College Susan Engel (USA) teacher Shalva Amonashvili (Georgia). There were also closed screenings of three films: "Most Likely to Succeed" (2015, USA), "Mission: Joy - Finding Happiness in Troubled Times" (2021, USA) and "Why am I alive" (Чому я живий, 2021, Ukraine).

Regional unconferences

After attending EdCamp Ukraine's unconferences, educators volunteer to hold regional unconferences, or mini-EdCamps, for their communities. These regional unconferences are held monthly in different Ukrainian education institutions. Between 2015 and 2020, there were 186 regional unconferences. In 2017, EdCamp Ukraine held around 40 regional unconferences in different Ukrainian cities, supported by the US Embassy and different Ukrainian companies.

In 2016, the EdCamp Ukraine team held a competition for educators to hold official mini-EdCamps in their cities, and received 25 applicants. From 2017 on, EdCamp Ukraine has provided support and financing to teachers who win the contest through their EdCamp in a Box program. Between 2015 and 2021, there were 234 regional unconferences. In 2021, EdCamp Ukraine held around 45 regional unconferences in different Ukrainian cities.

EdCamp Ukraine began developing EdCamp in a Box in 2016. In 2017, the organization established the project EdCamp in a Box 3.0. The project provides competition winners with necessary documentation, support, and funds to hold a regional unconference in different Ukrainian cities.

Other projects for educators

In 2018, the I National summit-challenge "EdCamp-Angels in Action" was held in Odessa, Ukraine, and was visited by 100 mini-EdCamps coordinators from across the country. During the summit, nine organizations joined the union to support New Ukrainian School reform.

In 2018, EdCamp Ukraine published a book, Improving with EdCamp: How to hold educational unconferences for your community, which illustrates EdCamp Ukraine's main principles and education methods as well as step-by-step advice for offering a mini-EdCamp in any city. The same year, the organization introduced their own online course, How to Organize EdCamp for Your Community.

Also in 2018, three training sessions organized by EdCamp Ukraine, the Ministry of Education and Science of Ukraine, the United Nations Population Fund, and other Ukrainian organizations were held to certify experts for their anti-discrimination project. Forty-seven members attended to increase their knowledge and skills.

In October 2021, the EdCamp Ukraine team presented a course titled Educators' Professional Development: New Regulations And Possibilities, on the Ukrainian online course platform Prometheus. EdCamp Ukraine also has its own educational podcast on YouTube and Mixcloud online platforms.

In March 2020, EdCamp partnered with the Ministry of Education and Science in Ukraine and other organizations to hold a national online professional development training session for 4,000 educators. That same year, an online meeting was held to discuss the reopening of educational institutions after the COVID-19 quarantine, as well as innovations in education with Ukrainian specialists and public figures such as Lilia Hrynevych.

Next, EdCamp Ukraine, with Ukrainian and Swedish partners, set up a contest among young educators from the Donetsk and Luhansk regions of Ukraine; 30 educators took part.

From November to December 2020, EdCamp Ukraine ran an EdCamp online marathon for educators to discuss, learn, and incorporate new teaching methods and practices during the worldwide epidemic of COVID-19 and the period of distance education.

Activities during full-scale Russian invasion in 2022 
Since February 24, 2022, EdCamp Ukraine has been implementing a number of anti-crisis initiatives to support educators, parents, children and youth during the war.

 Open Space of Sustainability  - open online meetings for all with specialists from the Institute of Trauma and Emory University.

 EdCamp-academy for students, teachers and parents  - a system of regular activities to support adults and children.

 Thematic expert materials on sensitive topics  - videos, infographics, cartoons with tips, explanations, lists on topics related to evacuation from hotspots, travel abroad, adaptation to new places, volunteering, etc.

 Appeals of famous people to Ukrainians  - supporting video or text appeals, "messages of hope", made by famous people, like Richard Branson, Esther Wojcicki, Andreas Schleicher, Edith Eger to Ukrainians.

Research and reforms in education

De-bureaucratization in schools

In 2016, EdCamp Ukraine and the Ministry of Education and Science of Ukraine took an anonymous poll of almost 8,000 educators in regard to paperwork. They used the research to introduce an initiative supporting de-bureaucratization in schools. In 2017, they published "Children and Paperwork: reaching balance in school" to report the results of the research, illustrating the issue from different angles and providing ideas for reforming school paperwork systems. Later in 2017, due to the anti-bureaucracy initiative, teachers were relieved of conducting the student census.

In 2018, the Ministry of Education and Science passed new regulations in regard to school documentation, decreasing the amount of paperwork in schools by 20% to 30%.

New Ukrainian School Reform

In 2016, the concept of the New Ukrainian School was outlined and discussed at the second EdCamp Ukraine unconference. This reform initiative became the main subject of discussions between Ukrainian educators and government through EdCamp Ukraine unconference 2017. That year, the Ministry of Education and Science of Ukraine released a document publishing the main concepts, aims, and reform stages for the New Ukrainian School. Oleksandr Elkin, the founder and head of EdCamp Ukraine with vice-president Olena Massalitina co-authored the New Ukrainian School Reform concept. The New Ukrainian School was the first Ukrainian educational reform movement to include soft skills (creativity, openness for communication and partnership, and conflict resolution) into school curriculum. Soon after, Ukrainian teachers started to integrate some of the concepts of the New Ukrainian School into the school system.

In 2018, the reform was officially introduced into schools. That year, during the summit challenge for regional coordinators of mini-EdCamps around Ukraine, nine Ukrainian organizations joined the union to support and lobby for further development of the New Ukrainian School.

In 2017, EdCamp Ukraine established the #книгоНУШ project, aimed at creating book clubs and compiling vital educational books as the foundation for the New Ukrainian School system. Ukrainian poet, novelist, essayist, and translator Serhiy Zhadan was one of the first activists to support and promote the initiative.

Anti-discrimination expertise

From 2016 on, EdCamp Ukraine partnered with the United Nations Population Fund and the Heinrich Böll Foundation in Ukraine to research discrimination in education and create anti-discrimination projects.

In 2017, EdCamp Ukraine, the Ministry of Education and Science of Ukraine, and the Institute of Education Content Modernization established an anti-discrimination review of Ukrainian textbooks. Later that year, according to the initiative, textbooks for 1 and 10 grades were reviewed by the anti-discrimination expert commission for the first time in history.

From 2016 through 2020, EdCamp Ukraine holds anti-discrimination trainings for textbook authors and publishers. Starting in 2018, the organization also holds trainings and a summit to teach educators how to review textbooks according to anti-discrimination principles.

While at the beginning of the project, no textbooks fully met the anti-discrimination educational standards, by 2018, 22% of books met the new anti-discrimination regulations. In 2019, that rose to 42%.

As of 2020, anti-discrimination review officially became part of the textbook-approval procedure.

Professional education

In 2018, EdCamp Ukraine, with the Ministry of Education and Science of Ukraine, International Renaissance Foundation (IRF), and other Ukrainian organizations, did a research project called "To teach and to learn: how Ukrainian education can grow" in regard to educators' professional development. The project involved 8,427 educators, and 87% of them expressed the desire to develop professionally and learn the English language. At the time, 11% could speak English. EdCamp Ukraine and the Ministry of Education and Science started to work on an initiative to enable educators to officially develop their professional skills, not only through government-sponsored education but also through non-governmental organizations, business ventures, and with the help of other sponsors.

In 2019, the Ministry of Education and Science passed new regulations in regard to teacher's professional development. According to the new regulations, Ukrainian educators are to spend a minimum of 150 hours every five years developing their professional skills. The whole process is funded by government or local budgets, which is the essential rule of another newly established principle, "money follows the teacher." Educators can fulfill those hours through educational and scientific institutions or private and legal business ventures, and are free to choose among the institutions that provide such services.

The Ministry of Education and Science created a group to work on professional development topics which included EdCamp Ukraine founder and president Oleksandr Elkin and vice-president Olena Massalitina.

Anti-corruption initiative

Since 2018, EdCamp Ukraine has partnered with the USAID project "Support to Anti-Corruption Champion Institutions" (SACCI). Together with other Ukrainian ventures and organizations, they work to decrease corruption in Ukrainian schools. One result of the partnership was an anti-corruption educational toolkit for teachers to use in, teaching children how to fight corruptive practices. The toolkit contains games, quests, and ideas for training sessions. As of 2020, session on anti-corruption techniques became part of all annual EdCamp Ukraine unconferences.

EdWay 
In 2021, the organization launched EdWay - the National platform for professional development opportunities for teachers, where educators are free to choose the subject, form, type and content of professional development.

Lessons of kindness 
In 2021, EdCamp Ukraine together with #GenerousTuesdayChildren (#ЩедрийВівторокДіти) and a specially selected team of authors developed a manual for the formation of a culture of charity in the educational process: "Lessons of kindness: ideas and tips for the school year".

International projects and partnerships

Over the years, Ukrainian EdCampers have promoted their organization and its ideas in Armenia, Georgia, Belarus, and Moldova. They served as advisors for African and Italian EdCamps. The EdCamp Ukraine team has close relationships with educators in the US, Finland, Germany, Sweden, Israel, and Singapore.

Early events

From 2015 through 2020, EdCamp Ukraine supports and celebrates Global Dignity Day, and gives classes in regard to it in Ukraine. During the sixth annual Global Dignity Day celebration in 2020, the organization attracted Ukrainian schools to participate by holding lessons and discussions in online and offline formats. In September  2020, the president of EdCamp Ukraine, Oleksand Elkin, was appointed Global Dignity Country Chair for Ukraine. Since 2015, 2,789 educational institutions and 379,843 participants have joined the celebration of the Day of Dignity.

In 2017, the Ukrainian version of the Global Teacher Prize was announced and officially begun at the national unconference. Oleksandr Elkin served as a judge for the annual prize from 2017 to 2019.

In 2017, EdCamp Ukraine introduced a new branch of activity: international trips aimed at researching education in different countries, called EdTrips. Its first destinations were Finland and Estonia. Later, EdTrips visited Sweden.

In 2018, EdCamp, in partnership with Lumo Education, established another international project, Seven Days of Change. In this program, the EdCamp Ukraine team invited Finnish educators to visit a Ukrainian school and share Finnish educational concepts with Ukrainian staff. Out of 675 applicants, a school in Poltava Oblast won the chance to host Finnish colleagues.

SEE Learning and partnership with Dalai Lama XIV

An EdTrip in 2019 visited Dharmsala, India. There, 16 participants were invited to meet with the Dalai Lama. He introduced the concept of Social Emotional Ethical Learning (SEE Learning), created by the Emory University in the US. The program is aimed at learning basic human skills such as resilience, empathy, and concentration. That same year, the EdCamp Ukraine team was invited to an official SEE Learning presentation in New Delhi.

The concept of SEE Learning was widely discussed during the fifth unconference. The concept was supported by the Deutsche Gesellschaft für Internationale Zusammenarbeit (GIZ) and incorporated in 26 Ukrainian schools from 23 regions of the country for a trial period as part of the New Ukrainian School reform. After the success of the SEE Learning trials, the program was officially introduced in 26 Ukrainian schools.

By 2020, EdCamp Ukraine became Emory University's official SEE Learning partner in Ukraine and launched introductory online sessions on SEE Learning to around 20,000 educators. Teachers in schools that incorporated the program took part in training sessions with program developers from Emory University (US) and Ukrainian experts working on the project.

In 2020, for the first time in the history of Ukraine, an online conversation between Dalai Lama XIV and the Ukrainian people was held. The meeting was hosted by Oleksandr Elkin; Liliya Hrynevych, former Minister of Education and Science of Ukraine; Taras Topolya, UNICEF Youth Ambassador to Ukraine and well-known Ukrainian singer; and Nataliya Moseychuk, a TV host recognized nationwide. Topics were education for peace, peace in the world, and the pandemic's influence on the world. The Dalai Lama also answered questions from Ukrainian citizens.

Awards and recognition

Organization

In 2017, EdCamp Ukraine won first prize at the 5th National Competition of Public Non-Government Organizations.

Personal achievements

In 2017, Focus magazine listed Oleksandr Elkin among the 100 most influential Ukrainians.

In 2018, Oleksandr Elkin was among five Ukrainian men nominated for the 2019 Father of the Year award in the Father-Educator category.

In 2020, the vice-president of EdCamp Ukraine Olena Massalitina was awarded Woman of the Year in the Secondary Education category within the "Ukrainian Women" contest. The same year, she became one of the 100 Most Influential Ukrainian Women as chosen by Focus magazine.

In 2021, Oleksandr Elkin entered the ranking of the 100 most influential people in Ukraine according to the rating of FOCUS magazine and took 85th place.

In 2022, NV named Oleksandr Elkin a "Ukrainian Prometheus".

In May 2022, Olexander Elkin became a member of the Supervisory Board of VN Karazin Kharkiv National University.

Records

As part of the fourth national unconference in 2018, 600 EdCampers gathered at Constitution Square in Kharkiv for a flash mob. This gathering was later registered in the Ukrainian Record Book as the biggest educators' gathering.

In 2019, Ukrainian and international educators set another record during the 2019 unconference: 650 educators gathered at Constitution Square in Kharkiv and educators from 25 Ukrainian regions joined the flash mob online. "The biggest number of locations to join an online educators' flash mob" was registered in the Ukraine Record Book.

In 2020, more than 10,000 people attended the EdCamp Ukraine online unconference, the largest attendance of an online educational conference in Ukraine to date. This record was registered in Ukrainian National Record Register.

See also 

 EdCamp
 Ministry of Education and Science of Ukraine
 United Nations Population Fund
 Heinrich Böll Foundation
 Professional development
 Global Teacher Prize

References

Literature cited

External links 
 EdCamp Ukraine official website

Unconferences
Teacher training
Educational organizations
Progressive education
Organizations based in Kharkiv
Educational organizations based in Ukraine